Thecesternus humeralis is a species of broad-nosed weevil in the beetle family Curculionidae. It is found in North America.

References

Further reading

 
 

Entiminae
Articles created by Qbugbot
Beetles described in 1826